Chang Shiow-jen (born 1 August 1951) is a Taiwanese politician.

Chang is a graduate of Ming Chuan University. She then took courses in business administration at New York University and in politics at Harvard University. She was elected to the National Assembly in 1996. Chang did not complete her term as an assembly member, as she was subsequently elected to the Legislative Yuan in 1998, and won reelection in 2001. She represented overseas Chinese on behalf of the Democratic Progressive Party while sitting on the Legislative Yuan. In 2003, she advocated for Taiwan to attend the 56th World Health Assembly. Chang stepped down at the end of her second legislative term in 2005. She was placed on the Democratic Progressive Party list for the 2008 legislative election, but not elected to office.

References

1951 births
Living people
Members of the 4th Legislative Yuan
Members of the 5th Legislative Yuan
21st-century Taiwanese women politicians
20th-century Taiwanese women politicians
Party List Members of the Legislative Yuan
Democratic Progressive Party Members of the Legislative Yuan
Harvard University alumni
New York University alumni
Ming Chuan University alumni
Taiwanese expatriates in the United States